Lucy Sante (formerly Luc Sante; born May 25, 1954) is a Belgium-born American writer, critic, and artist. She is a frequent contributor to The New York Review of Books. Her books include Low Life: Lures and Snares of Old New York (1991). She lived as a male until announcing in September 2021 that she was transitioning to female. She wrote on her Instagram account: "Yes, this is me, and yes, I am transitioning.... You can call me Lucy ...and my pronoun, thankyouverymuch, is she."

Biography
Born in Verviers, Belgium, Sante migrated to the United States in the early 1960s. She attended school in New York City, first at Regis High School in Manhattan and later at Columbia University from 1972 to 1976; due to several incompletes and outstanding library fines, she did not take a degree. Since 1984 she has been a full-time writer. Sante worked in the mailroom and then as assistant to editor Barbara Epstein at The New York Review of Books. She became a regular contributor there, writing about film, art, photography, and miscellaneous cultural phenomena, as well as book reviews.

Her books, include Low Life: Lures and Snares of Old New York (1991), a non-fiction book documenting the life and politics of lower Manhattan from the mid-19th century to the early 20th century; Evidence (1992), the autobiographical The Factory of Facts (1998), Walker Evans (1999), Kill All Your Darlings: Pieces 1990-2005 (2007), Folk Photography (2009), and The Other Paris (2015). She co-edited, with the writer, her former wife, Melissa Holbrook Pierson, O. K. You Mugs: Writers on Movie Actors (1998), and translated and edited Félix Fénéon's Novels in Three Lines (2007) for the New York Review Books (NYRB) series.

In the early 1980s, she wrote lyrics for the New York City-based band The Del-Byzanteens. Sante wrote the text for Take Me To The Water: Immersion Baptism In Vintage Music And Photography, a collection of historical photos of American baptismal rites, published by Dust-to-Digital in 2009.

Having taught in the Columbia MFA writing program, Sante now lives in Ulster County, New York, and teaches writing and the history of photography at Bard College.

She announced on September 20, 2021, that she was transitioning to female. She wrote on her Instagram account: "Yes, this is me, and yes, I am transitioning–I have joined the other team. Yes, I've known since at least age 11 but probably earlier and yes, I suppressed and denied it for decades.... I started...hormone replacement therapy in early May....You can call me Lucy (but I won't freak out if you misgender me) and my pronoun, thankyouverymuch, is she." In February 2022 she wrote an essay in the magazine Vanity Fair explaining her transition at almost 70 years old.

Publications

Original text
Low Life: Lures and Snares of Old New York. Macmillan, 1991. .
Evidence (1992)
The Factory of Facts (1998)
The first chapter is available online.
The Unknown Soldier (short story, 1998)
Walker Evans (1999)
Kill All Your Darlings: Pieces 1990-2005 (2007)
Folk Photography: The American Real-Photo Postcard, 1905–1930 (2009)
Take Me To The Water: Immersion Baptism In Vintage Music And Photography (2009)
The Other Paris (2015)
Beastie Revolution - Beastie Boys Book - Chapter 2 - Spiegel & Grau (2018)
Maybe the People Would Be the Times (2020)
Nineteen Reservoirs (2022)

Editor
O. K. You Mugs: Writers on Movie Actors (1998; with Melissa Holbrook Pierson)

Translator
Félix Fénéon's Novels in Three Lines (2007)
"Beastie Revolution", Beastie Boys Book, Random House Audio (2018) – voice recording

Exhibitions 
While Sante began creating art in the 1960s, she had her first gallery show in 2020 at the James Fuentes Gallery.

Awards and honors 
1989: Whiting Award
1992–1993: Guggenheim Fellowship
1997: Literature Award from the American Academy of Arts and Letters.
1998: Grammy for best album notes (Sante was one of the album note writers for the 1997 re-issue of the Anthology of American Folk Music).
2010: Infinity Award for writing, from the International Center of Photography, New York City

References

External links
 
 
 
 

 
 

1954 births
Living people
People from Verviers
Walloon people
Bard College faculty
Columbia College (New York) alumni
Grammy Award winners
Regis High School (New York City) alumni
Belgian emigrants to the United States
Belgian contemporary artists
Belgian curators
Transgender women
Transgender writers
Belgian transgender people
Belgian LGBT writers
Transgender academics